Dirty Tennis is a 1989 short comedy parody video about tennis instructional videos. It stars Dick Van Patten, Caitlyn Jenner and Nicollette Sheridan. It was written by James Van Patten and directed by Jonathan Baker and George J. Bloom. The short comedy was released on VHS in 1989.

As part of Dick Van Patton's post-Eight is Enough popularity, it was written by Van Patton's son Jimmy to  depict in a comedic fashion how Dick is able to defeat a skilled opponent in a tennis game by using poor sportsmanship cheats.

Plot 

In a parody of tennis instructional videos, Dick Van Patten takes on the role of an unscrupulous tennis player whose only interest is to beat opponent Caitlyn Jenner (appearing as "Bruce Jenner", before her transition) in any manner possible, including interruptions caused by his using a sexy Nicollette Sheridan as a secret weapon of distraction.

Cast 

 Dick Van Patten as himself
 Caitlyn Jenner as Bruce Jenner 
 Nicollette Sheridan as herself
 Pat Van Patten as herself
 Vince Van Patten as himself
 Jimmy Van Patten as himself
 Nels Van Patten as himself

Reception 

Star-News wrote, "This 33 minute assault on uppity tennis etiquette is Jenner and Van Patton's answer to Tim Conway's Dorf on Golf attack on golf course snobbery".  Of her participation as co-producer, actress Kristy McNichol described it as a "hilarious video about all the dirty little tricks you can play on your partner to win", stated the short had "done very well in the market", and shared that producing it "was a lot of fun."

The Philadelphia Inquirer shared that Dick Van Patten as a "self-described tennis hacker" and Bruce Jenner as a "dashing Olympic-class athlete" would seem unlikely as a comic duo. They expanded that the teaming of the two such unlikely men "in this parody of a how-to program works wonderfully," and "not solely because of the contrast in their ages and conditioning."  Van Patton as a mischievous bad fellow plays well "against his nice-guy image" and causes Jenner to turn "his public persona upside-down" by being unafraid in acting "like a chump, preening in his sparkling tennis togs one moment and pitching a spoiled-brat tantrum the next." Praising the film overall, they concluded "Suffice it to say that in the small universe of comedy tapes that have been made expressly for home video, Van Patten has come up with a winner. And although Jenner may have lost on the court, he's bound to win new respect for his abilities as a clown."

The Washington Post called Dirty Tennis "Dick Van Patten's Spinal Tap", and wrote the film stood as "a towering monument to the 1980s VHS era" when "mid-level celebrities could rent a camcorder, cobble together 60 minutes of junk video, splice it all together and ship it off to consumers who were starving to rent somethinganythingthey could jam into their VCRs."

The Chicago Sun-Times gave the film three stars, and wrote "Dirty Tennis adds up to 33 minutes of malicious enjoyment, [it] is downright nastyand therefore thoroughly delightful".

Notes

References

External links 

 
 
 

1989 short films
1989 films
American short films
1980s English-language films